Martin Rančík (born June 5, 1978) is a Slovak former professional basketball player.

College career
Rančík played college basketball with the Iowa State Cyclones, from 1997–2001.

Professional career
During his pro career, Rančík was named the Slovak Player of the Year, in 2001 and 2002.

Personal life
Rančík's younger brother, Radoslav Rančík, is also a former professional basketball player.

References

External links
 Euroleague.net Profile
 Eurobasket.com Profile
 Spanish League Profile 
 Italian League Profile 

1978 births
Living people
Bilbao Basket players
CB Estudiantes players
CB Lucentum Alicante players
Centers (basketball)
Fortitudo Pallacanestro Bologna players
Iowa State Cyclones men's basketball players
Liga ACB players
Olimpia Milano players
Olympiacos B.C. players
Power forwards (basketball)
Saski Baskonia players
Slovak expatriate basketball people in Spain
Slovak expatriate basketball people in Italy
Slovak men's basketball players
Sportspeople from Nitra